Kadek Raditya Maheswara (born 13 June 1999) is an Indonesian professional footballer who plays as a centre-back for Liga 1 club Madura United.

Club career

Persiba Balikpapan
Raditya was born in Denpasar and started his professional career with Persiba Balikpapan in 2018.

Madura United
He was signed for Madura United to play in the Liga 1 in the 2019 season. Kadek Raditya made his league debut on 5 October 2019 in a match against Persib Bandung at the Gelora Bangkalan Stadium, Bangkalan. On 14 December 2021, Maheswara scored his first goal for Madura United against Borneo in the 5th minute at the Manahan Stadium, Surakarta.

International career
In 2018, Kadek represented the Indonesia U-19, in the 2018 AFC U-19 Championship.

Career statistics

Club

Honours

International 
Indonesia U-19
 AFF U-19 Youth Championship third Place: 2017, 2018

References

External links
Kadek Raditya at PSSI
Kadek Raditya at Soccerway

1999 births
Living people
Indonesian footballers
Liga 2 (Indonesia) players
Liga 1 (Indonesia) players
Indonesia youth international footballers
Association football defenders
Persiba Balikpapan players
Madura United F.C. players
Balinese people
People from Denpasar
Sportspeople from Bali